The Look for Less is a television show airing on the Style Network. Previously hosted by Survivor: The Australian Outback contestant Elisabeth Hasselbeck, the current host is America's Next Top Model winner Yoanna House. House was one of twelve contestants on America's Next Top Model, Cycle Two. In most episodes, a person must shop with a fashion stylist to recreate a runway outfit with a set budget (ex: $150) in under an hour.

External links
 The Look for Less Official Website - StyleNetwork.com
 The Look for Less Be On TV Application

Fashion-themed reality television series
English-language television shows
Style Network original programming
2000s American reality television series
2001 American television series debuts
2002 American television series endings